"Anotherloverholenyohead" is a 1986 song by Prince and The Revolution, from the album Parade, the soundtrack to the film Under the Cherry Moon.  The song is essentially a full band performance by Prince & the Revolution, with backing vocals from Susannah Melvoin, and the horn section of Eric Leeds and Atlanta Bliss. The song also features a string arrangement by Clare Fischer. The song is set in a minor key, and written around a piano chord sequence, although the arrangement emphasizes an upfront guitar synth and a drum machine. The lyrics are about a man trying to reclaim a lover who is intent on leaving him for another. The song's title is a combination of the main idea of the song, and the line "U need another lover like u need a hole in yo head" from the chorus. The single received a 12" extended release with intricate piano work,a horn overdub and some dance commands from Prince.

The B-side was the LP version of "Girls & Boys" in the US, but since that was already released as a single on its own in the UK, the B-side there was "I Wanna Be Your Lover", from 1979's Prince.

Despite a large amount of publicity provided by its predecessors and the film Under the Cherry Moon, the single stalled at number 63 on the Billboard Hot 100 in the US and didn't fare much better in the U.K, where it reached number 36.

Music video
Filmed on 7 June 1986 (Prince's birthday), the music video features a live performance of the song, taken from the one-off set performed in Detroit, Michigan, USA at the Cobo Arena.

Track listing
 7" vinyl (North America)
 "Anotherloverholenyohead" – 3:58
 "Girls & Boys (Edit)" – 3:30

 7" vinyl (Europe)
 "Anotherloverholenyohead" – 3:23
 "I Wanna Be Your Lover (Edit)" – 2:57

 2x7" vinyl (Europe)
 "Anotherloverholenyohead" – 3:23
 "I Wanna Be Your Lover (Edit)" – 2:57
 "Mountains" – 3:58
 "Alexa de Paris" – 3:20

 12" vinyl (North America)
 "Anotherloverholenyohead (Extended Version)" – 7:24
 "Girls & Boys (LP Version)" – 5:30

 12" vinyl (Europe)
 "Anotherloverholenyohead (Extended Version)" – 7:24
 "I Wanna Be Your Lover (LP Version)" – 5:47

Personnel
 Prince — lead vocals and various instruments
 Lisa Coleman — keyboards and vocals
 Wendy Melvoin — guitar and vocals
 Dr. Fink — keyboards
 Brown Mark — bass
 Bobby Z. — drums and percussion
 Susannah Melvoin — backing vocals
 Clare Fischer — orchestral arrangements

Charts

References

Prince (musician) songs
Songs written by Prince (musician)
1986 singles
Paisley Park Records singles
Warner Records singles
Song recordings produced by Prince (musician)
Songs written for films
1986 songs